Nicholas Paul Punto (born November 8, 1977) is an American former professional baseball infielder. He played in Major League Baseball (MLB) for the Philadelphia Phillies, Minnesota Twins, St. Louis Cardinals, Boston Red Sox, Los Angeles Dodgers, and Oakland Athletics. With the Cardinals, he won the 2011 World Series over the Texas Rangers. He has also played for the Italian national baseball team in the World Baseball Classic.

Career

Early career

Punto attended Trabuco Hills High School in Mission Viejo, California and stayed in Mission Viejo to attend Saddleback College before being drafted in the 21st round of the 1998 MLB Draft by the Philadelphia Phillies. Punto played in the Phillies system for the Class A Clearwater Phillies, Class A Batavia Muckdogs, Class AA Reading Phillies and Class AAA Scranton/Wilkes-Barre Red Barons before his promotion to the majors.

Philadelphia Phillies (2001-2003)
Drafted in the 21st round of the 1998 MLB draft, Punto made his major league debut with the Philadelphia Phillies on September 9, 2001. He singled to right field off Bob Scanlan of the Montreal Expos as a pinch hitter in the 8th inning. He had 2 hits in 5 at-bats in just 4 games with the Phillies that season. In 2002 with the Scranton/Wilkes-Barre Red Barons, he played in 115 games and hit .271, earning a selection as an International League All-Star.

In 3 years with the Phillies he played in a total of 77 games and hit .223. His first, and only, home run with the Phillies was hit off Steve Trachsel of the New York Mets on July 10, 2003.

Minnesota Twins (2004-2010)
He started the season with the team, but he was injured twice and spent the majority of his time in 2004 on the disabled list. In , he competed for the starting job at second base, which he eventually won, and in  became the starting third baseman.

Punto was one of four Twins players nicknamed "The Piranhas" by then Chicago White Sox manager, Ozzie Guillén. The other Piranhas were Jason Tyner, Jason Bartlett, and Luis Castillo.

In 2005 Nick Punto batted .239, with a career high 4 home runs, and 26 runs batted in over the duration of 112 games.

Punto had his best full season in Minnesota during the 2006 season when he batted .290 with 45 runs batted in, and posted 17 stolen bases in 135 games.

In , Punto experienced his statistically worst full season with Minnesota, batting .210 with 25 runs batted in 150 games. He posted the lowest slugging percentage (.271) of any major league player with at least 200 at-bats in a single season. Punto also posted a −27.1 VORP in 2007, 8.5 runs worse than the second-worst position player in baseball, White Sox infielder Andy González. However, he has always played excellent defense and believed in his defensive abilities which the Twins are so keen on. On May 27 during an MPR broadcast Punto said, "I take too much pride in my defense to ever let (offensive struggles) affect me or affect my team. The one thing I can control is how I play defense."

After being injured most of the first half of the  season, Punto was activated from the DL on June 25, 2008 and finished the season batting .284 with 28 runs batted in. Punto spent most of the 2008 season as the Twins' primary shortstop.

Punto signed a new two-year deal with the Twins worth $8.5 million following the 2008 season, with a club option for 2011 worth $5 million.

Punto represented Team Italy in the 2009 World Baseball Classic.

After struggling as the Twins regular shortstop in 2009, Punto began losing time in the lineup to fellow Twin Brendan Harris. After returning from the disabled list, Punto was re-inserted into the regular lineup at second base, following the struggles of infielders Alexi Casilla and Matt Tolbert. He finished the season batting .228 with 38 RBI over 440 plate appearances.

Punto began the 2010 season as the Twins' starting third baseman, but ended up on the disabled list before the end of April with a strained groin muscle. Punto returned to the lineup in May, playing at third base, shortstop, and second base as injuries cropped up among other players. In July, he was essentially replaced as the starter at third base by Danny Valencia, but he continued to play regularly due to injuries to Orlando Hudson and J. J. Hardy.

On October 29, the Twins declined Punto's $5 million team option, making him a free agent. In 7 years with the Twins, Punto played in 747 games with a .248 batting average.

St. Louis Cardinals (2011)
On January 21, 2011 Punto signed a one-year contract with the St. Louis Cardinals worth $700,000. He played in 63 games with the Cardinals, as a utility player, and hit .278 with a career high .388 OBP in 133 at bats. Punto had 3 hits in 14 at-bats, with five walks in the 2011 World Series as the Cardinals defeated the Texas Rangers.

Boston Red Sox (2012)
On December 14, 2011, Punto agreed to a 2-year contract with the Boston Red Sox worth $3 million. In 65 games with the Red Sox in 2012, he hit .200 while starting games at second base, third base and shortstop. He also appeared in five games at first base.

Los Angeles Dodgers (2012-2013)

On August 25, 2012 he was traded to the Los Angeles Dodgers (along with Josh Beckett, Carl Crawford and Adrián González and $11 million in cash) for James Loney, Iván DeJesús, Jr.,  Allen Webster and two players to be named later (Jerry Sands and Rubby De La Rosa). He appeared in 22 games with the Dodgers and hit .286.

Punto represented Italy in the 2013 World Baseball Classic in March 2013. He hit .421 in 19 at bats in 5 games.

In the 2013 season, Punto saw extensive time at shortstop due to injuries to Hanley Ramírez. He appeared in 116 games, his most since 2009, and hit .255 with 2 HR, 21 RBI and 34 runs.

On September 16, 2013, Punto led off a game against the Arizona Diamondbacks with a single to center field off of Trevor Cahill. Despite the fact that the ball traveled into the outfield, Punto made a headfirst slide into first base anyway.

Oakland Athletics (2014)
On November 13, 2013, Punto agreed to a one-year, $3 million contract with the Oakland Athletics, that included a vesting option for 2015. His numbers dropped off from the year before, as he hit just .207 with 2 home runs and 14 RBIs in 198 at-bats.

Punto's option for the 2015 season vested but the Athletics released him on December 19, 2014.

Arizona Diamondbacks
On January 7, 2015, Punto signed a minor league contract with the Arizona Diamondbacks that included an invitation to spring training. However, on February 20, Punto informed the Diamondbacks that he would not be reporting to spring training and would be taking the year off from baseball, though he was not officially retiring. He officially announced his retirement from baseball on February 18, 2016.

Honors

Punto was inducted into the Saddleback College Athletics Hall of Fame, joining notable former Saddleback and MLB players Tim Wallach and Mark Grace.

Personal life
Punto and his wife, Natalie, have three children.

References

External links

1977 births
Living people
Baseball coaches from California
American people of Italian descent
Baseball players from San Diego
Batavia Muckdogs players
Boston Red Sox players
Clearwater Phillies players
Fort Myers Miracle players
Los Angeles Dodgers players
Major League Baseball infielders
Major League Baseball second basemen
Major League Baseball third basemen
Memphis Redbirds players
Minnesota Twins players
Oakland Athletics players
Philadelphia Phillies players
Quad Cities River Bandits players
Reading Phillies players
Rochester Red Wings players
Saddleback Gauchos baseball players
Scranton/Wilkes-Barre Red Barons players
Springfield Cardinals players
Sportspeople from Mission Viejo, California
St. Louis Cardinals players
2009 World Baseball Classic players
2013 World Baseball Classic players